Hengxian Middle School is a public senior high school located in Heng county, Guangxi Autonomous Region, the People's Republic of China. It was formally established as a public secondary educational institution in 1923. As of 2010, it has 53 classes, 203 staff and faculty members, and 3348 students.

References

Educational institutions established in 1923
Education in Guangxi
Heng County
1923 establishments in China